Ila Panda (26 October 1932 – 11 January 2005) was an Indian politician She was a Member of Parliament, representing Odisha in the Rajya Sabha the upper house of India's Parliament as a member of the Janata Dal.

References

Rajya Sabha members from Odisha
Janata Dal politicians
Women members of the Rajya Sabha
1932 births
2005 deaths